Jeremy Beal (born December 2, 1987) is a former American football defensive end who was a member of the Denver Broncos and the Saskatchewan Roughriders. He was once considered one of the top defensive end prospects for the 2011 NFL Draft, but was drafted in the 7th round by the Broncos. Beal played college football for the University of Oklahoma.

Early years
Beal attended Creekview High School in Carrollton, Texas. As a senior, he was an all-state linebacker after recording 127 tackles, two sacks, and one interception return for a touchdown.

Regarded as a four-star recruit by Rivals.com, he was listed as the No. 19 strongside defensive end prospect in the class of 2006.

College career
Beal played college football at Oklahoma. After being redshirted as a freshman in 2006, Beal was moved to defensive end and recorded 21 tackles and had a sack as a redshirt freshman in 2007. Beal became a starter as a sophomore in 2008 and earned first-team All-Big 12 by the Associated Press after recording a team high 8.5 sacks with 54 tackles. As a junior in 2009 Beal recorded 61 tackles, 11 sacks, and an interception.

Professional career

Pre-Draft

Denver Broncos
Beal was drafted in the seventh round by the Denver Broncos of the 2011 NFL Draft as the 247th overall selection.

On August 31, 2013, the Denver Broncos waived Beal.

References

External links
Oklahoma Sooners bio

1987 births
Living people
American football defensive ends
Oklahoma Sooners football players
Denver Broncos players
Players of American football from Texas
People from Carrollton, Texas